Dragonite International Limited, formerly known as Ruyan Group (Holdings) Limited (Simplified Chinese:如烟集团有限公司; Traditional Chinese: 如煙集團有限公司; Pinyin: rúyān Jítuán Yǒuxiàn Gōngsī), and initially, Golden Dragon Group (Holdings), is a health care and pharmaceutical company. In 2013, Imperial Tobacco purchased Dragonite's electronic cigarette division.

History
Mr. Hon Lik (now Ruyan America's Chairman) patented a design (using high-frequency electronics) and is the original inventor of the first e-cigarettes sold (2003) and Ruyan has registered patents in more than 40 countries since 2003. Ruyan began to form the idea for the electronic cigarette in 2000.

In 2003, SBT was established, and the first patent was registered in the same year in China. In 2007, Ruyan's first international patent was registered. The patent was later granted in the United States as well.

In May 2004, Ruyan's cigar-series was launched and sold in the People's Republic of China market.  In October of the same year, the e-pipe series of Ruyan was launched. As for electronic cigarette products, the "V8" Model, which more closely resembles the appearance of traditional cigarettes, was the key product for 2007. At the end of 2007, Ruyan launched a new one-time use cigar product (named "RUYAN e-Gar" in Europe, Africa, the Middle East and Asia/Pacific and RUYAN Vegas in the Americas).

In June 2007, the Group - currently known as "SBT Investment (Holdings) Limited"- acquired the entire share structure of Best Partners Worldwide Limited – the former entity that was established for the manufacturing and sales of electronic atomizing cigarettes.  The Group takes an active position in developing the domestic and overseas markets under the brand name of "Ruyan" (Simplified Chinese: 如烟; Traditional Chinese: 如煙; Pinyin: rúyān).

In 2013, Imperial Tobacco acquired the intellectual property owned by Hon Lik through Dragonite for $US 75 million.

It is important to point out, that almost all e-cigarettes sold now (2013) use a simpler battery powered heating element that heats a liquid to vapour, as opposed to the piezoelectric/ high-frequency/ultrasonic technology patented by Ruyan. The marketing term "e" denoting "electronic" refers mainly to the circuitry that controls the current and has been accepted by the industry as a general term for vapour type cigarettes. The first battery operated "electric" cigarette patent registered in the United States was by Herbert A. Gilbert (Beaver Falls, PA, USA) on 17 August 1965.

Product development

Ruyan Ruyan V8 (electronic cigarette)

The Ruyan V8 is an electronic cigarette (e-cigarette) invention and production of Ruyan Group (Holdings) Limited.  It was first manufactured and launched in the Chinese market in 2006. The Ruyan V8 atomizes a solution-mixture that may or may not contain nicotine; it produces a vapor. It is free of the 4,000 chemicals commonly produced by a lit, ordinary cigarette, including highly dangerous tar and carbon monoxide. The Ruyan V8 comes in 5 different colors: Red, Blue, White, Brown, Black; replaceable cartridges come in several flavors, including: Black Tea, Fruit, Virginia, Menthol Tea, Jasmine and others. The Ruyan V8 is offered in a set containing one e-cigarette (with battery), one spare battery, a charger and cord, one cartridge and an instruction manual.

Ruyan E-pipe (electronic pipe)

The Ruyan e-pipe was first manufactured and launched in the Chinese market in 2004. It is a non-flammable atomizing electronic pipe that performs the same functions and features as an ordinary pipe.
Currently, there are two types of Ruyan e-pipe devices - one is Rosewood and the other is agate.  Like the Ruyan e-cigarette, the Ruyan e-pipe comes with two rechargeable lithium ion batteries and replaceable nicotine cartridges in 32 mg, 20 mg and 0 mg strengths. Cartridges deliver the same amount of vapor equivalent to the "puffs" provided by two packages of cigarettes for the average traditional smoker.

Ruyan E-cigar (electronic cigar)

The first generation of Ruyan Electronic Cigars was first manufactured and launched in the Chinese market in 2004.  The device itself comes in several designs. Cartridge flavors include Original, Fruit, and Menthol.

RUYAN Vegas and RUYAN e-Gar represent the second generation in Ruyan electronic cigars.  They were first manufactured and launched in the Chinese market in late 2007 where the new product is referred to as RUYAN No. 1. In the Americas, however, the product is called RUYAN Vegas, and in Europe, the Middle East, Africa and Asia/Pacific, the product is branded RUYAN e-Gar.  This new line of products has its own unique features. The new products look more like traditional cigars.  They are five and one-half inches in length with a circumference of approximately a size 50 ring.  Like other Ruyan e-cigarette products, RUYAN Vegas and RUYAN e-Gar produce no tar and no second-hand smoke and can be used anytime, anyplace.

RUYAN Vegas and RUYAN e-Gar are disposable products that deliver more than 1800 puffs of vapor - roughly equivalent to the number of puffs commonly consumed with a full carton of cigarettes. The products come fully charged, with a 16 mg nicotine cartridge pre-installed. They may also be easily stored and may be carried upright, mouthpiece up, in a pocket or briefcase.

RUYAN Vegas was awarded the honor as the most marketable new product at the 2008 Tobacco Plus Expo held in Las Vegas from April 23 to 25th, 2008.

Legal disputes
In February 2009, Ruyan released a press release saying that they had asserted patent rights to the e-cigarette in a key Chinese court ruling and that a rival manufacturer, Cixi E-cig, had been ordered to destroy its entire inventory and cease trading. Cixi E-cig responded by denying the statement asserted by Ruyan. A Chinese court had ruled that two of their products did infringe on Ruyan's intellectual property regarding products containing piezoelectric technology, and they were required to stop producing those specific products.

In June 2012, Ruyan filed patent infringement lawsuits against six U.S. electronic cigarette manufacturers in the United States District Court for the Central District of California.

References

External links
Ruyan Chinese Website
Ruyan Group (Holdings) Limited
(Simplified Chinese) Relating to the problems and regulatory issues of Ruyan. Retrieved on 4 March 2009.

2003 establishments in Hong Kong
Companies listed on the Hong Kong Stock Exchange
Manufacturing companies of China
Health care companies established in 2003
Electronic cigarette manufacturers
2013 mergers and acquisitions